The Science Fiction and Fantasy Writers of America, doing business as Science Fiction and Fantasy Writers Association, commonly known as SFWA ( or ) is a nonprofit 501(c)(3) organization of professional science fiction and fantasy writers. While SFWA is based in the United States, its membership is open to writers worldwide. The organization was founded in 1965 by Damon Knight under the name Science Fiction Writers of America. The president of SFWA as of July 1, 2021 is Jeffe Kennedy.

As of 2022, SFWA has about 2,500 members worldwide.

Active SFWA members may vote for the Nebula Awards, one of the principal English-language science fiction awards.

Mission
SFWA informs, supports, promotes, defends and advocates for its members.

SFWA activities include informing science fiction and fantasy writers on professional matters, protecting their interests, and helping them deal effectively with agents, editors, anthologists, and producers in print and non-print media; encouraging public interest in and appreciation for science fiction and fantasy literature; sponsoring, editing, and disseminating writings, papers, books, pamphlets, and other publications which exemplify science fiction and fantasy literature of high quality; conducting conferences, public discussion groups, forums, lectures, and seminar programs; and furnishing services connected with this stated purpose.

History
Science Fiction Writers of America, Inc. was founded in 1965 by Damon Knight in association with a group of writers connected to the Milford Conference, which he also headed. According to Todd McCaffrey, the organization immediately "acquired great status in its efforts to help J.R.R. Tolkien get fair recompense in America for pirated sales of The Lord of the Rings". In 1991, the name of the organization was changed to Science Fiction and Fantasy Writers of America, to reflect the fact that the organization had always included writers working in multiple genres. After the name change, both SFWA and SFFWA were used as acronyms. The acronym SFWA was re-established officially in 1996.

In 1973, SFWA awarded an honorary membership to Polish author Stanisław Lem. Lem never had a high opinion of the genre, including American science fiction, describing it as ill-thought-out, poorly written, and interested more in making money than in ideas or new literary forms. After his eventual American publication, when he became eligible for regular membership, his honorary membership was rescinded, following the stance taken mostly by Philip José Farmer. Several members protested that decision, including Ursula K. Le Guin, who quit her membership and then refused the Nebula Award for Best Novelette for The Diary of the Rose.

In 1982, Lisa Tuttle withdrew her short story "The Bone Flute" from the final Nebula ballot, to protest what she saw as excessive campaigning for awards and that voters did not receive copies of nominated works. Her withdrawal was sent after voting had been completed. When informed she had won, she contacted SFWA and told them she refused to accept it. She was told that her reasons for doing so would be announced. Her publisher accepted the award in her place, apparently with no knowledge of her withdrawal, and there was no mention of her objection.

In September 2009, SFWA joined the Open Book Alliance to oppose the Google Book Settlement. As a party to the class action suit, SFWA had recently explained its reservations about the settlement and declared its intention to file an objection. 

In 2013, the SFWA Bulletin was the subject of a controversy about sexism (see below). This led to a brief hiatus, followed by a reboot of the magazine.

In 2014, the original Massachusetts corporation was dissolved and SFWA reincorporated as a California nonprofit 501(c)3 organization with new bylaws.

In 2022, the organization filed to do future business as the Science Fiction and Fantasy Writers Association to reflect the participation of their non-US members.

Activities
SFWA participates in various trade shows and publishing industry events in the United States and abroad, including BookExpo America, the American Library Association Midwinter Conference, the USA Science & Engineering Festival, and several major (and minor) science fiction, fantasy and media conventions. SFWA holds a semi-annual business meeting at the World Science Fiction Convention (Worldcon) when it is held in North America, and at the North American Science Fiction Convention (NASFiC) otherwise.

SFWA also hosts its own events, which include:
SFWA Nebula Conference: SFWA Nebula Conference is an annual conference during which a banquet is held and Nebula Award winners are announced and presented. Other Nebula Awards Weekend events include a semi-annual SFWA business meeting and a mass autographing session for member authors, which is open to the public. In recent years, an extensive program of panels and workshops for professional writers has been offered. SFWA Nebula Conference, and the earlier Nabula Awards Weekend have been held at different cities throughout the United States. It is held in a different location every two years. It will be held in Los Angeles, CA in 2020, the second year at that location.
The SFWA Reception in New York: SFWA has hosted an annual reception in New York to provide SFWA members the opportunity to meet and socialize with editors, agents, publicists, art directors and other publishing industry professionals. Over the years, the reception has gone by several names, including Authors and Editors, Mill and Swill, and the NY Reception. The event was put on hold in 2015 because of rising costs.
The SFWA Reading Series: A series of free quarterly events during which SFWA authors read or discuss their fiction with members of local communities. Currently held in Seattle, WA, Portland, OR, and Philadelphia, PA, but the program may soon expand to other areas.

Advocacy and support
As an organization, SFWA acts as an advocate to effect important changes within the publishing industry, especially among publishers of science fiction and fantasy, by promoting author-friendly copyright legislation, equitable treatment of authors, and fair contract terms.

Writer Beware
SFWA sponsors Writer Beware, whose mission is to track, expose, and raise awareness of the prevalence of fraud and other questionable activities in and around the publishing industry. Writer Beware exists as a subpage of the SFWA website, which provides the latest information on literary schemes, scams, and pitfalls; the Writer Beware blog, which provides the latest information on literary schemes, scams, and pitfalls; the Writer Beware blog, which provides up-to-the-minute information on specific scams and schemes, along with advice for writers and industry news and commentary; and the Writer Beware Facebook page, which posts links to articles, news items, and warnings of interest to writers, and provides a forum for discussion. Writer Beware receives the support of the Mystery Writers of America and the Horror Writers Association.

Writer Beware maintains an extensive database of complaints on questionable literary agents, publishers, independent editors, writers’ services, contests, publicity services, and others, and offers a free research and information service for writers. Writer Beware staff assist law enforcement agencies with investigations of literary fraud, and have been instrumental in the convictions of several literary scammers.

Griefcom
Griefcom, or the Grievance Committee, is formed of member volunteers who undertake to mediate writer disputes and grievances between member writers and their publishers.

Emergency Medical Fund
SFWA's Emergency Medical Fund was established to assist eligible writers who have unexpected medical expenses.

Legal Fund
SFWA's Legal Fund was established to create loans for eligible member writers who have writing-related court costs and other related legal expenses.

Estate Project
Founded by longtime SFWA member Bud Webster, the Estate Project is now headed by Mishell Baker. It maintains a list of the estates of deceased SFWA member writers and coordinates with living member writers to make arrangements for their future estates. The Estate Project also accumulates information about authors' archives for member writers, living or dead.29.

Awards

Nebula Awards: Since 1965, SFWA Active and Lifetime Active members select by vote the Nebula Awards for best short story, novelette, novella, and novel published during the previous year, where the four categories are defined by numbers of words. In 2018, a fifth category for game writing was added. 
Damon Knight Memorial Grand Master Award: Since 1975, the Damon Knight Memorial Grand Master Award has been awarded for lifetime achievement in science fiction or fantasy.
Ray Bradbury Award: Since 1992, the Ray Bradbury Award has been selected by a vote and presented for best dramatic presentation. Named in honor of Ray Bradbury.
Author Emeritus: From 1995 to 2009, the Author Emeritus title was awarded to a senior writer "in the genres of science fiction and fantasy who made significant contributions to our field but who are no longer active or whose excellent work may no longer be as widely known as it once was."
Andre Norton Award: Since 2005, the Andre Norton Award has been selected by a vote and presented for best young adult or middle grade novel. Named in honor of Andre Norton.
Kevin O'Donnell Jr. Award for Service to SFWA: Since 1995, presented to recognize service to the organization. Named in honor of Kevin O'Donnell Jr. in 2009 because of his exemplary service to the organization.
Kate Wilhelm Solstice Award: Since 2009, SFWA has presented the Solstice Award, which recognizes lifetime contributions to the science fiction and fantasy field. The award can be given to up to three people, but is usually given to one live person and one deceased person. In 2016, the award was renamed the Kate Wilhelm Solstice Award.

Publications

The SFWA Bulletin

The SFWA Bulletin is a quarterly magazine that SFWA members receive as part of their membership, but it is also available (by subscription) to non-members. The Bulletin carries nonfiction articles of general interest to writers, especially science fiction and fantasy writers. It accepts submissions, for which the pay rate is 8 cents a word. The current Bulletin editor is Neil Clarke.

In 2013, a controversy about sexism in the Bulletin led to the resignation of editor Jean Rabe on June 5, 2013. More than 50 authors wrote blog posts in objection to comments by longtime contributors Mike Resnick and Barry N. Malzberg that included references to "lady editors" and "lady writers" who were "beauty pageant beautiful" or a "knock out", an article by C. J. Henderson praising Barbie for maintaining "quiet dignity the way a woman should", and the "exploitative" cover image of no. 200 of the Bulletin depicting a woman in a chain-mail bikini. Several authors used the occasion to speak out against sexism in science fiction genre circles more broadly. The controversy continued through Bulletin no. 202, which contained another column by Resnick and Malzberg, discussing the response to their earlier column. Their column framed that response as censorship, referring to their critics as "liberal fascists". In February 2014 a proposal to establish an advisory board to oversee content was met by a petition circulated by editor and critic Dave Truesdale supporting freedom of speech in the Bulletin.

As a result of the controversy, SFWA president John Scalzi apologized to members, and the Bulletin was put on hiatus for six months. It reappeared with the Winter 2014 Special Issue, #203, but has been on a reduced schedule, publishing an average of 2 issues per year.

The special issue was edited by Tansy Rayner Roberts and Jaym Gates and "was specially created to be used as an outreach tool for conventions and other events." The issue's contents and cover were welcomed by some as an antidote to the perceived sexism of past issues though Sue Granquist felt that something looked "suspiciously like a woman in a burka".

The Forum Binary
The Forum Binary is a biannual publication that functions as SFWA's internal publication of record for members. As such, it is not available to non-members.

The SFWA Blog
SFWA also publishes short essays and other content relevant to writers on the SFWA Blog.

Membership
Most members live in the United States but membership is open to qualifying writers worldwide. Authors, regardless of nationality or residence, must be professionally published in a qualifying market as listed by SFWA in order to become SFWA members. At present, all listed qualifying markets publish only in the English language.

Active: for eligible professionally published authors in the genres of science fiction, fantasy, or horror; the minimum qualification is the sale of one novel or dramatic script, or three short stories, to venues with certain minimum circulations or pay rates. In recent years, writers may qualify using self-published and gaming credentials. Active members may attend business meetings, vote in elections, receive access to private discussion forums, gain entry into SFWA exclusive events and suites at conventions, receive SFWA publications, and may recommend, nominate, and vote on works for the Nebula Awards.
Associate: for writers of science fiction or fantasy who have not yet qualified for Active membership, but who have made a qualifying sale. Associate members receive SFWA publications and access to private discussion forums, as well as entry into SFWA suites at conventions, and they may recommend and nominate works for the Nebula Awards but cannot vote.
Affiliate: for industry professionals in science fiction or fantasy (such as academics, editors, agents, artists, graphic novelists, reviewers, etc.) who are not eligible to become an Active or Associate member, and organizations which have a legitimate interest in science fiction and fantasy (such as high schools, colleges, universities, libraries, and similar institutions, as well as broadcasting organizations, film producers, futurology groups and similar organizations).
Estate: for the legal representatives of the estates of deceased authors who were Active members or who were qualified to be an Active member at any time during their writing career.
Life: for Active members in good standing who paid lifetime dues. Discontinued new Life memberships in 2008.
Senior: for Active members who have maintained continuous membership for thirty(30) years or more.
Family/Group: for two or more Active, Associate, or Affiliate members living at the same address.
Dues range from $90 for Associate membership up to $115 for Affiliate membership.

Presidents

Damon Knight (1965–1967)
Robert Silverberg (1967–1968)
Alan E. Nourse (1968–1969)
Gordon R. Dickson (1969–1971)
James E. Gunn (1971–1972)
Poul Anderson (1972–1973)
Jerry Pournelle (1973–1974)
Frederik Pohl (1974–1976)
Andrew J. Offutt (1976–1978)
Jack Williamson (1978–1980)
Norman Spinrad (1980–1982)
Marta Randall (1982–1984)
Charles Sheffield (1984–1986)
Jane Yolen (1986–1988)
Greg Bear (1988–1990)
Ben Bova (1990–1992)
Joe Haldeman (1992–1994)
Barbara Hambly (1994–1996)
Michael Capobianco (1996–1998)
Robert J. Sawyer (1998)
Paul Levinson (1998–2001)
Norman Spinrad (2001–2002)
Sharon Lee (2002–2003)
Catherine Asaro (2003–2005)
Robin Wayne Bailey (2005–2007)
Michael Capobianco (2007–2008)
Russell Davis (2008–2010)
John Scalzi (2010–2013)
Steven Gould (2013–2015)
Cat Rambo (2015–2019)
Mary Robinette Kowal (2019–2021)
Jeffe Kennedy (2021–)

References

External links
 
 SFWA Bulletin
 Nebula Awards Home Page
 Writer Beware

 
American science fiction
American fantasy
Non-profit organizations based in California